Ulrike Goldmann (born 17 June 1980) is a German singer and vocalist of the German electro-gothic band Blutengel since October 2005.

Music career
Ulrike Goldmann has a trained voice and has been singing her entire life. Her first band was an electro-pop duo called Say - Y, who signed to Chris Pohl's label, Fear Section in 2003 and released their album Refill later that year, the first one under a record label. Say - Y toured along with Blutengel opening concerts during their 2004 Demon Kiss Tour and in September 2005 Ulrike left the band in good terms to join Blutengel. In an interview, Goldmann said she was invited by a friend to see a Blutengel concert in Potsdam, during their Angel Dust Tour in March 2003. She was amazed with the show and got to meet Chris, Constance, and Eva after the concert and they quickly became friends. Since joining she has gained fame by singing Seelenschmerz, Vampire Romance, Black Roses and Krieger (2014). Goldmann's debut was in The Oxidising Angel.

Discography

With Blutengel
 2005: The Oxidising Angel – EP
 2006: My Saviour – Single
 2007: Lucifer (Purgatory) & (Blaze) – Single
 2007: Labyrinth – Album
 2008: Moments of Our Lives – DVD
 2008: Winter of My Life – Single
 2008: Dancing in the Light (Forsaken) & (Solitary) – Single
 2009: Schwarzes Eis – Album
 2009: Soultaker – EP
 2010: Promised Land – Single
 2011: Reich Mir Die Hand – Single
 2011: Tränenherz - Album
 2011: Über den Horizont - Single
 2011: Nachtbringer - EP
 2012: Save Our Souls - Single
 2013: You Walk Away - Single
 2013: Monument - Album
 2013: Kinder dieser Stadt - Single
 2013: Once in A Lifetime - DVD
 2014: Black Symphonies (An Orchestral Journey) - Album
 2014: Krieger - Single
 2014: Asche zu Asche - Single
 2015: Sing - Single
 2015: Omen (Retitled: Save Us) - Album
 2015: In Alle Ewigkeit - EP
 2016: Nemesis: The Best of & Reworked - Album
 2017: Leitbild:  - Album

With Say - Y
 2000: The Day After Day – Album
 2000: SMS - Single
 2000: Sweet Secret – Maxi
 2001: love.letters.GAME OVER – Album
 2002: Angels – Single
 2002: Say Y  – EP
 2003: Refill – Album
 2008: A Collection Of The Years – Compilation

Guest appearances
 2004: Staubkind: Keine Sonne – Single
→ Vocals in Endlos (Frei Von Dir) (Piano Version)
 2005: Cephalgy: Finde Deinen Dämon – Album
→ Vocals in Mein Versprechen.
 2005: Staubkind: Träumfänger – Album
→ Vocals in Schlaflied, Endlos (Frei Von Dir), Schlaflied II, Schlaflied (Unheilig Remix) 2012: Lord Of The Lost : Die Tomorrow - Album
→ Vocals in Never Let You Go 2014: Staubkind : Alles Was Ich Bin (Deluxe Version) - Album
→ Vocals in Endlos 2014''
2017:OST+FRONT:"Wrecring Ball"

References
Ulrike Goldmann on Discogs

Living people
1980 births
21st-century German women singers